Raja Narendra Lal Khan Women's College (Autonomous), also known as Gope College or Raja Narendra Lal Khan Mahila Mahavidyalaya, is an undergraduate and postgraduate women's college in Midnapore, West Bengal. It was established in 1957. It is affiliated with Vidyasagar University.

History
This college began its journey from the historical Gope palace on 22 August 1957. Historical Gope palace is the present administrative building of this college and was built during the time of Raja Narendra Lal Khan, the king of Narajole in 1895. Mrs.Anjali Khan, wife of Sri Amarendra Lal Khan of the Narajole Royal Family, donated the Gope palace for the establishment of this college. This college was named after the name of Gope palace founder, Raja Narendra Lal Khan. This college was initially affiliated with the University of Calcutta. In 1986, the affiliation of this college was changed from the University of Calcutta to the Vidyasagar University. University Grants Commission has given Autonomous status to Raja Narendra Lal Khan Women's College from the 2018-19 session.

Location

The college is situated in Kankabati Gram Panchayat, Paschim Medinipur district. It is 2 km from Midnapore Railway Station and 14 km from Kharagpur Railway Station, both under the South Eastern Railway. Midnapore Central Bus Stand is 3 km from the college.

Departments and Courses
This college offers different undergraduate and postgraduate courses in the science, and arts branches. This college aims at imparting education to the women undergraduates of lower- and middle-class people of Midnapore and its adjoining areas. Every department of this college offers undergraduate degree courses. Postgraduate courses are offered by few departments of this college.

Science
The science faculty consists of the departments of Chemistry, Physics, Mathematics, Computer Science and Application, Botany, Zoology, Physiology, Microbiology, Economics, and Nutrition.

Arts
The arts faculty consists of the departments of Bengali, English, Hindi, Sanskrit, History, Political Science, Philosophy, Geography, Education, Physical Education, Music, Human Rights, and Psychology.

Accreditation
Recently, Raja Narendra Lal Khan Women's College has been re-accredited and awarded A grade by the National Assessment and Accreditation Council (NAAC). The college is recognized by the University Grants Commission (UGC).

See also

References

External links

Colleges affiliated to Vidyasagar University
Educational institutions established in 1957
Women's universities and colleges in West Bengal
Universities and colleges in Paschim Medinipur district
1957 establishments in West Bengal